Le Père humilié is a four-act theatre play by Paul Claudel, which constitutes the third and last part of La Trilogie des Coûfontaine.

Staging 
 1962: Bernard Jenny, Théâtre du Vieux-Colombier

See also 
L'Otage
Le Pain dur
List of works by Paul Claudel

External links 
  Les Archives du Spectacle
Le Père humilié, édition Gallimard, Paris, 1920.  on Google Books.

French plays
1920 plays